MKJ or mkj may refer to:
 MKJ, the IATA code of Makoua Airport, Republic of the Congo
mkj, the ISO 639 code of the Mokilese language of Micronesia
Martin Luther King Jr., American civil rights activist